Huckleberry Hill School  may refer to:

 Huckleberry Hill School (Connecticut), located in Brookfield, Connecticut
 Huckleberry Hill School (Massachusetts), located in Lynnfield, Massachusetts